"Babooshka" is a song by English singer Kate Bush, taken from her third studio album Never for Ever (1980). Released as a single in June 1980, it spent 10 weeks in the UK chart, peaking at number five. It was an even bigger hit in Australia, where it peaked at number two (for three weeks) and was the 20th best-selling single of the year. A rock song, "Babooshka" is about a woman who sends love letters to her husband under the titular pen name. The song makes notable use of Fairlight CMI digital synthesizer.

Background and composition
Kate Bush recorded "Babooshka" between January and June 1980, during the recording sessions of Never for Ever. It was described as a rock song. The track features John Giblin on bass and marks the significance of fretless bass sounds as instrumental "male" partners through Bush's music in the early eighties. The song ends with a sample of glass breaking, one of the earliest examples of a sample created with the newly available Fairlight CMI digital synthesizer.

According to an interview Bush gave to the Australian TV series Countdown in 1980, the song chronicles a wife's desire to test her husband's loyalty. To do so, she takes on the pen name of Babooshka and sends notes to her husband in the guise of a younger woman—something which she fears is the opposite of how her husband currently sees her (hence the barbed lines "Just like his wife before she 'freezed' on him/Just like his wife when she was beautiful".) Bush said that's "something I didn't realise at the time", when she learnt that бaбушка (babushka) is the Russian word for "grandmother" (although the stress in Russian falls on the first syllable, not the second).

The trap is set when, in her bitterness and paranoia, Babooshka arranges to meet her husband, who is attracted to the character who reminds him of his wife in earlier times. She thereby ruins the relationship due to her paranoia. Bush cited the English folk song "Sovay", in which a woman dresses as a highwayman and accosts her lover in order to test his devotion, as an inspiration for the story of Babooshka. "I'm sure I heard about it on some TV series years ago, when I was a kid," Bush remarked of the song's story. "You know, these period things that the BBC do. I think it's an extraordinary thing for someone to do... That's why I found it fascinating."

Music video
The music video depicts Bush beside a double bass (contrabass) that symbolises the husband, wearing a black bodysuit and a veil in her role as the embittered wife. This changes into an extravagant, mythlike, and rather revealing "Russian" costume as her alter-ego, Babooshka. An illustration by Chris Achilleos for the cover of the 1978 book Raven – Swordsmistress of Chaos was the basis for the costume.

The B-side contains her song "Ran Tan Waltz", her second non-album B-side. This song is performed as a tragicomedy, where Bush portrays a man bemoaning his bad luck in life being married to a wayward mother. This song uses the word "dick" in the first verse as dysphemism for a penis. Bush has stated that she does not typically use such harsh language or write such sexually explicit material, but that she considered the song "good naughty fun".

Reception
"Babooshka" became Bush's second top five hit in the UK and was certified silver for sales of over 250,000 by the BPI.

In 2021, the song experienced a resurgence in popularity due to the app TikTok, giving American audiences exposure to Bush.

Track listing

Personnel
Kate Bush – vocals; piano; Fairlight CMI; Yamaha CS-80
Paddy Bush – balalaika; backing vocals
Garry Hurst – backing vocals
Alan Murphy – electric guitar
Brian Bath – electric guitar
John Giblin – electric bass
Max Middleton – Fender Rhodes piano
Stuart Elliott – drums; tambourine

Charts

Weekly charts

Year-end charts

Certifications

References

External links
 [ AllMusic review of "Babooshka"]
 

1980 singles
Kate Bush songs
Songs about infidelity
Songs about letters (message)
Songs written by Kate Bush
1980 songs
EMI Records singles